Li Erran Li from the Bell Labs, Alcatel-Lucent, Edison, New Jersey, was named Fellow of the Institute of Electrical and Electronics Engineers (IEEE) in 2013 "for contributions to the design of algorithms and protocols for wireless networks". He was elected as an ACM Fellow in 2017.

References

External links
 Faculty webpage

Fellow Members of the IEEE
Fellows of the Association for Computing Machinery
Living people
21st-century American engineers
Year of birth missing (living people)
American electrical engineers